Bollberg is a village and a former municipality in the district Saale-Holzland, in Thuringia, Germany. Since 1 January 2019, it is part of the town Stadtroda.

References

Former municipalities in Thuringia
Saale-Holzland-Kreis